Bosyginskaya is a rural locality (a village) in Nizhnekuloyskoye Rural Settlement, Verkhovazhsky District, Vologda Oblast, Russia. The population was 26 as of 2002. There are 2 streets.

Geography 
Bosyginskaya is located 40 km east of Verkhovazhye (the district's administrative centre) by road. Orekhovskaya is the nearest rural locality.

References 

Rural localities in Verkhovazhsky District